Estadio Hugo Bogado Vaceque is a multi-use stadium in the Zeballos Cué barrio of Asunción, Paraguay.  It is the home ground of the Club General Caballero of Primera División de Paraguay.  The stadium holds 5,000 spectators and opened in 1918.

The name comes from one of its presidents, José Hugo Bogado Vaceque.

References

Multi-purpose stadiums in Paraguay
Football venues in Asunción
Sports venues in Asunción
Sports venues completed in 1918